The 1973 Women's Open Squash Championships was held at the BP Club in Lower Sydenham, London from 2–8 March 1973. Heather McKay (née Blundell) won her twelfth consecutive title defeating Cecilie Fleming in the final. The final match lasted just sixteen minutes as McKay once again continued to easily outplay all opposition.

Seeds

Draw and results

First round

Second round

Third round

Quarter-finals

Semi-finals

Third-place play-off

Final

References

Women's British Open Squash Championships
Sydenham, London
British Open Squash Championship
Women's British Open Squash Championship
Squash competitions in London
Women's British Open Championship
British Open Championship
Women's British Open Squash Championship